Antiplanes vinosa, common name the left-handed turrid, is a species of sea snail, a marine gastropod mollusk in the family Pseudomelatomidae.

Description
The length of this sinistral shell attains 30 mm.

Distribution
This marine species occurs off the Aleutians and Northern Japan.

References

 Dall, W.H. (1874a) Catalogue of Shells from Bering Strait and the Adjacent Portions of the Arctic Ocean, with Descriptions of Three New Species. 7 pp.
 Hasegawa K. (2009) Upper bathyal gastropods of the Pacific coast of northern Honshu, Japan, chiefly collected by R/V Wakataka-maru. In: T. Fujita (ed.), Deep-sea fauna and pollutants off Pacific coast of northern Japan. National Museum of Nature and Science Monographs 39: 225–383

External links
 Specimen at MNHN, Paris
 
 

vinosa
Gastropods described in 1874